C. maritimus may refer to:
 Cathormiocerus maritimus, a weevil species in the genus Cathormiocerus
 Ceanothus maritimus, a buckthorn species
 Chaerea maritimus, a spider species in the genus Chaerea
 Cordylanthus maritimus, a broomrape species
 Croton maritimus, a rushfoil species in the genus Croton
 Cryptanthus maritimus, a bromeliad species

See also
 Maritimus (disambiguation)